Speed Up is an Italian motorcycle racing team and constructor founded in 2010 and based in Vicenza, Italy. In 2012 the company started building its own branded chassis under the Speed Up Factory name. Beginning with the 2021 season, the company re-branded their factory-entered machines under the name Boscoscuro to better differentiate between their own racing team and chassis kits supplied to other teams.

History
The team was founded in 2010 by the former Grand Prix motorcyclist Luca Boscoscuro and entered the newly formed Moto2 class of the world championship. In the team's first year they achieved three wins with their S10 motorcycle, based on a FTR Moto M210 frame, ridden by Andrea Iannone and Gábor Talmácsi. In 2011 the Speed Up team elected to enter an FTR M211 chassis ridden by Pol Espargaró and Valentin Debise.

In 2012 Speed Up started building its own chassis named the S12. Boscoscuro entered into partnership with Andrea Iannone's Speed Master team supplying him with the new frames and fielding a bike for Mike Di Meglio; the best results were achieved by Iannone thanks to two victories. During the season, the QMMF Racing Team switched from Moriwaki to Speed Up frames.

In 2013 saw the debut of the SF13 chassis, fielded by three teams – Forward Racing, AGR and QMMF Racing Team, no factory team raced this year, achieving only a podium with Simone Corsi as a best result.

In 2014 Speed Up debuted the new SF14 frame, entering its own team with Sam Lowes and again supplying the QMMF Racing Team, who won the Dutch TT with Anthony West.

In 2015 followed a similar pattern with Sam Lowes and Anthony West remaining with their respective teams; West being joined in the QMMF team by Julián Simón. 
Lowes finished the season as the only non-Kalex rider in the top 14 of the final championship standings, in 4th place in the year-end table, having won at the Circuit of the Americas.

In 2016 saw Speed Up's own team line up with a new rider in Simone Corsi, with Lowes having left to join Gresini Racing in 2016 with a following MotoGP contract for 2017. The QMMF team raced with West and Simón.

In 2021, with a view to differentiating the racing team from the chassis production, the motorcycle prototype frames produced were renamed under the brand Boscoscuro.

Results

Notes
* Season still in progress.

References

External links

Motorcycle racing teams
Italian companies established in 2010
Motorcycle manufacturers of Italy
Motorcycle racing teams established in 2010
2010 establishments in Italy